The Africa Movie Academy Award for Best Production Design is an annual merit by the Africa Film Academy to reward the best art direction in a film for the year. It was introduced in 2008 as Achievement in Art Direction but was renamed to Best Production Design since the 2011 edition.

References

Lists of award winners
Africa Movie Academy Awards